Alimbeg Borisovich Bestayev (15 August 1936 – 1988) was an Ossetian lightweight freestyle wrestler. Competing for the Soviet Union he won the world title in 1957 and an Olympic bronze medal in 1956. He also won the 1956 World Cup, pinning all five his opponents within 20 minutes overall time spent on the mat, and winning the outstanding wrestler award of the tournament, regardless of style and weight class.

Bestayev was born in South Ossetia and first trained in the Georgian style of wrestling chidaoba. He took up traditional wrestling in 1951, when his family moved to Vladikavkaz. He won his only Soviet title in 1955 and placed second in 1956. In 1956 he won the World Cup, and was selected for the 1956 Olympics. At the Olympics, he won his first three bouts by fall, but then lost to Gyula Tóth and Emam-Ali Habibi. He retired after placing second at the 1962 Soviet Championships to become a wrestling coach in Moscow.

References

1936 births
1988 deaths
Olympic wrestlers of the Soviet Union
Wrestlers at the 1956 Summer Olympics
Russian male sport wrestlers
Olympic bronze medalists for the Soviet Union
Olympic medalists in wrestling
Ossetian people
Medalists at the 1956 Summer Olympics
World Wrestling Championships medalists
People from Tskhinvali